The Gate of Manifest Virtue is a gate in the Forbidden City. It is located on the eastern side next to the Gate of Supreme Harmony. It was first called the Eastern Corner Gate in the Ming Dynasty.

References

External links

 

Buildings and structures in Beijing
Forbidden City